The 1974–75 Greek Football Cup was the 33rd edition of the Greek Football Cup. The competition culminated with the Greek Cup Final, held at Karaiskakis Stadium, on 18 June 1975. The match was contested by Olympiacos and Panathinaikos, with Olympiacos winning by 1–0. Panathinaikos competed with their reserve (youth) team, as a protest for the decision of the Hellenic Football Federation the final to be held in Karaiskakis Stadium, home ground of Olympiacos.

Calendar

Knockout phase
In the knockout phase, teams play against each other over a single match. If the match ends up as a draw, extra time will be played. If a winner doesn't occur after the extra time the winner emerges by penalty shoot-out.The mechanism of the draws for each round is as follows:
There are no seedings, and teams from the same group can be drawn against each other.

First round

Olympiacos Volos from Alpha Ethniki and 59 clubs from Beta Ethniki entered the first round.

|}

Second round

|}

Bracket

Round of 32

The rest 17 clubs from Alpha Ethniki entered the third round.

|}

Round of 16

|}

Quarter-finals

|}

*Suspended at 75th minute while the score was 1–2 and was awarded to Panathinaikos.

Semi-finals

|}

Final

The 31st Greek Cup Final was played at the Karaiskakis Stadium.

References

External links
Greek Cup 1974-75 at RSSSF

Greek Football Cup seasons
Greek Cup
Cup